Lankower See may refer to:

 Lankower See (Dechow)
 Lankower See (Schwerin)